Chang is a village in Bhiwani district in the Indian state of Haryana. , the village had 2,595 households with a population of 12,979 of which 6,961 were male and 6,018 female. The Chang was founded by Thakur Jait singh Parmar in 1310 (vikramisamvat). This is a great example of a community full of 36 castes. It is on Meham Road. Then it was subdivided in two villages Dhani Chang and Chang. All the descendants of Thakur Jait Singh shifted into Dhani Chang.

References

Villages in Bhiwani district

It is highly developed in agricultural and industrial sector and knows for its fishing culture, horticulture, dairy farming and others sectors in agricultural department . It is hub for innumerable  workers  in factories, in the fields, markets and others various place.
Village have proud history for its freedom fighters and players at national or international levels . Village gives numerable of young and youth boys in military service every years .About 500 military person from the village is active in the services and serving the country with his soul .